Jeffers Bridge, also known as the Birch Creek Bridge and Clay County Bridge #127, is a historic Pratt through truss bridge located in Perry Township and Sugar Ridge Township, Clay County, Indiana. It was built by the Vincennes Bridge Company in 1926.  It once carried County Road 200S over Birch Creek. It is currently closed to traffic from disrepair. The bridge measures 91 feet long and rests on concrete abutments and wingwalls.

It was added to the National Register of Historic Places in 2000.

References

Truss bridges in the United States
Road bridges on the National Register of Historic Places in Indiana
Bridges completed in 1926
Transportation buildings and structures in Clay County, Indiana
National Register of Historic Places in Clay County, Indiana